Sani Bečirovič (born 19 May 1981) is a Slovenian professional basketball coach, executive and former player, who is currently a sporting director for Cedevita Olimpija of the Slovenian League, ABA League and the EuroCup.

He was selected in the second round (46th overall) of the 2003 NBA Draft by the Denver Nuggets, but never played in the NBA. His father is Memi Bečirović, the former head coach of the senior men's Slovenia national team.

Professional playing career
Bečirovič played with the Slovenian youth squad teams of KK Bistrica, and he made his debut with their senior team during the 1995–96 season. He then moved to the Slovenian club Maribor Ovni for the 1996–97 season. He then moved to the Slovenian Premiere A League team Pivovarna Laško, where he played from 1997 to 1999, and next to the Slovenian team Olimpija Ljubljana, where he played from 1999 to 1901. With Olimpija Ljubljana, he won the 2001 Slovenian League Championship, and the 2000 and 2001 Slovenian Cups. He also played in Slovenia with Krka Novo Mesto, in the 2003–04 season.

He played in the Italian LBA league with Virtus Bologna, during the 2001–02 season, where he won the 2002 Italian Cup. He also played with the Italian clubs Casti Group Varese, in the 2004–05 season, and Climamio Bologna, in the 2005–06 season, where he won the 2005 Italian Super Cup.

Bečirović then moved to the Greek club Panathinaikos, where he won the Euroleague 2006–07 championship, two Greek Cups (2007, 2008), and two Greek League championships (2007, 2008). He signed with the Italian club AJ Milano on 15 January 2010. In October 2010, he signed a two-year contract with the Turkish Super League club Türk Telekom. In March 2011, he left Türk Telekom, by mutual agreement, and then signed with the Russian club CSKA Moscow, until the end of the 2010–11 season. In August 2011, he moved to the Italian club Benetton Treviso, for one season.

In October 2012, he signed with the Iranian Super League club Petrochimi Bandar Imam. On 14 April 2013, Bečirović signed with the Italian club Dinamo Sassari, until the end of the season. In August 2013, he returned to Iran, and signed a one-year deal with Foolad Mahan Isfahan.

In December 2013, Bečirović returned to the Slovenian club Krka Novo Mesto, for the 2013–14 season. In August 2014, he signed with Fulgor Libertas Forlì of the Italian Second Division. On 4 January 2015, he left Forli, and signed with Pallacanestro Piacentina of the Italian 3rd Division. On 16 March 2015, he parted ways with Piacentina.

National team career
Bečirovič was a member of the senior men's Slovenian national basketball team that competed at EuroBasket 1999, EuroBasket 2001, EuroBasket 2005 and the 2006 FIBA World Championship. He also played at the 2008 FIBA World Olympic Qualifying Tournament and at the 2010 FIBA World Championship.

Post playing career

Coaching career
Right after retiring from being a professional basketball player, Bečirovič returned to the Greek club Panathinaikos, where he worked as an assistant coach of Aleksandar Đorđević.

Executive career
On 13 June 2019, Bečirovič was appointed as the sports director of the newly formed Slovenian club Cedevita Olimpija.

Personal life
Bečirovič is married to Italian Simona, and he also holds an Italian passport. The couple have one daughter (Samija, born 2005), and one son (Kiam, born 2008). In 2013 he established the Sani Bečirovič Basketball Academy, of which he is currently the sports director.

His nickname is Sani Boy.

References

External links

  
Twitter Account 
FIBA Archive Profile
FIBA Europe Profile
Euroleague.net profile
Draftexpress.com Profile
Eurobasket.com Profile
Italian League Profile 
Greek Basket League Profile
NBA.com Draft profile

1981 births
Living people
2006 FIBA World Championship players
2010 FIBA World Championship players
ABA League players
Basketball executives
Denver Nuggets draft picks
Dinamo Sassari players
Foolad Mahan Isfahan BC players
Fortitudo Pallacanestro Bologna players
Fulgor Libertas Forlì players
Italian basketball coaches
Italian men's basketball players
KK Krka players
KK Zlatorog Laško players
KK Olimpija players
KK Cedevita Olimpija executives
Olimpia Milano players
Pallacanestro Treviso players
Pallacanestro Varese players
Pallacanestro Virtus Roma players
Panathinaikos B.C. non-playing staff
Panathinaikos B.C. players
PBC CSKA Moscow players
Petrochimi Bandar Imam BC players
Point guards
Shooting guards
Slovenian basketball coaches
Slovenian expatriate basketball people in Greece
Slovenian expatriate basketball people in Italy
Slovenian expatriate basketball people in Turkey
Slovenian men's basketball players
Slovenian people of Bosnia and Herzegovina descent
Small forwards
Sportspeople from Maribor
Türk Telekom B.K. players
Virtus Bologna players
Slovenian expatriate basketball people in Iran
Slovenian expatriate basketball people in Russia
Naturalised citizens of Italy